Jean-Claude Rambot (1621–1694) was a French sculptor and architect.

Early life 
Jean-Claude Rambot was born in 1621 in Franche-Comté.

Career
He became a renowned sculptor and architect in Aix-en-Provence.

As a sculptor, he designed the Fontaine des Quatre-Dauphins in 1667, a fountain listed as a monument historique since 1905. He also designed the Atlas of the Pavillon Vendôme. Additionally, he designed the Hôtel d'Arbaud-Jouques, located at 19 Cours Mirabeau and listed since 1990, in 1670.

Death
He died in 1694.

Legacy
The Parc Rambot, a public park in Aix-en-Provence, is named in his honour.

Gallery

References

1621 births
1694 deaths
People from Franche-Comté
17th-century French sculptors
French male sculptors
17th-century French architects